Gerald Wilson was a Canadian writer, best known for his screenplays. He had a notable collaborative relationship with Michael Winner. He wrote teleplays for Scandinavian television.

He was born in Pittsburgh and raised in Canada. He moved to England in 1955 and began writing for television.

According to one writer "the typically Wilsonian hero is an ageing professional with nothing more to learn about his craft" and "there is a strong political dimension in Wilson's work."

Select Credits
No Hiding Place - Deadline for Dummy (1963)
Crane (1964) (TV series)
The Man in Room 17 (TV Series) 
Robbery (1967) - story only
Vendetta - The Button Man (1967)
Champion House - The Saddest Words (1967)
Scream Free! (1969) (uncredited)
Thirty-Minute Theatre (1969) (TV Series) - The Boat to Addis Ababa 
Lawman (1971)
Chato's Land (1972)
Scorpio (1973)
The Stone Killer (1973)
Death Wish (1974) (uncredited)
Firepower (1979)
Mister Corbett's Ghost (TV Movie)
Under the Glacier (1989)
The Diver (2000)

References

External links

Gerald Wilson at Letterbox

20th-century Canadian screenwriters
20th-century Canadian male writers
Canadian male screenwriters